The 2002 UC Davis football team represented the University of California, Davis as an independent during the 2002 NCAA Division II football season. Led by tenth-year head coach Bob Biggs, UC Davis compiled an overall record of 9–3. 2002 was the 34rd consecutive winning season for the Aggies. UC Davis was ranked No. 14 in the NCAA Division II poll at the end of the regular season and advanced to the NCAA Division II Football Championship playoffs for the seventh straight year. The Aggies upset previously unbeaten and fifth-ranked  before losing in quarterfinal round 20th-ranked  . The team outscored their opponents 368 to 223 for the season. The Aggies played home games at Toomey Field in Davis, California.

Schedule

References

UC Davis
UC Davis Aggies football seasons
UC Davis Aggies football